Pico da Cruz (Portuguese meaning "peak of the cross") is a mountain in the eastern part of the island of Santo Antão. Its elevation is 1585 m. It is 5 km southwest of the town Pombas (Paul). It gives its name to the nearby village of Pico da Cruz, part of the municipality of Paul. Pico da Cruz is part of the protected area Cova-Paul-Ribeira da Torre Natural Park.

See also
 List of mountains in Cape Verde

References

Cruz
Geography of Santo Antão, Cape Verde
Cova-Paul-Ribeira da Torre Natural Park
Paul, Cape Verde
Porto Novo Municipality